Ulubabyan is an Armenian surname. Notable people with the surname include:

  Bagrat Ulubabyan (1925–2001), Armenian writer and historian
  Vardges Ulubabyan (born 1968), politician from Nagorno-Karabakh

Armenian-language surnames